Beaconsfield is an MBTA light rail station in Brookline, Massachusetts. It serves the Green Line D branch. It is located off Dean Road and Beaconsfield Road just south of Beacon Street. Like the other stops on the line, it was formerly a commuter rail station on the Boston and Albany Railroad's Highland branch, which was closed and converted to a branch of the Green Line. The station reopened along with the rest of the line in 1959.

Beaconsfield is not handicapped accessible; the low platforms do not permit level boarding. Beaconsfield station is located one block from Dean Road station on the C branch of the Green Line, offering an easy transfer point. The interchange is outside of fare control; passengers must still pay a second fare.

History

B&A station

The Boston and Worcester Railroad opened a  branch from Brookline Junction to Brookline on April 10, 1848. The Charles River Branch Railroad extended the Brookline branch to Newton Upper Falls in November 1852 and to Needham in June 1853. The Boston and Albany Railroad bought back the line, then part of the New York and New England Railroad, in February 1883. It was double-tracked and extended to the B&A main at Riverside; "Newton Circuit" service via the Highland branch and the main line began on May 16, 1886.

There was not originally a station on the line at Dean Road, as it was close to Reservoir station. In late 1906, transit magnate Henry Melville Whitney built a new station to serve his nearby Beaconsfield hotel. Work on the station began in October 1906 by the firm of Benjamin Fox. It was constructed in a heavy stone style similar to the Richardsonian Romanesque stations constructed elsewhere on the B&A system in the previous two decades. By November, the masonry was largely complete, the roof ready for tile, and the granolithic floor and  platform ready to be poured. The platform was poured in December 1906, and the station was opened then or soon after.

Conversion to streetcar service

In June 1957, the Massachusetts Legislature approved the purchase of the branch by the M.T.A. from the nearly-bankrupt New York Central Railroad for conversion to a trolley line. Service ended on May 31, 1958. The line was quickly converted for trolley service, and the line including Beaconsfield station reopened on July 4, 1959. The 1906-built station was torn down to build a parking lot; a small wooden shelter was built on the inbound platform.

The M.T.A. was folded into the Massachusetts Bay Transportation Authority (MBTA) in August 1964. The station has not been substantially modified during the MBTA era, though a heated shelter for fare machines on the outbound side was added around 2006. 

In 2019, the MBTA indicated that the four remaining non-accessible stops on the D branch were "Tier I" accessibility priorities. A preliminary design contract for accessibility modifications at the four stations was issued in February 2021. The station platforms will be raised and rebuilt, the wood shelter repaired, and a path constructed under Dean Road to Waldstein Playground. Design reached 75% in June 2022 and was completed late that year. Construction was expected to be advertised in February 2023 and begin midyear.

References

External links

MBTA - Beaconsfield
 Dean Street entrance from Google Maps Street View

Green Line (MBTA) stations
Railway stations in Brookline, Massachusetts
Former Boston and Albany Railroad stations
Railway stations in the United States opened in 1907
Railway stations closed in 1958
Railway stations in the United States opened in 1959
1907 establishments in Massachusetts